Guðmundur Viðar Mete (born 2 April 1981) is an Icelandic former footballer who played as a defender.

Guðmundur started his career in the Swedish leagues with Malmö FF, playing 34 league matches between 2000 and 2002. During this time, he also had a short loan spell in Denmark with FC Midtjylland in 2001. After leaving Malmö, Guðmundur spent two seasons with Superettan club IFK Norrköping, before returning to his home country with Keflavík in 2005. He played 54 league and cup matches in four years with the club, and later had spells with Valur and Haukar before joining Afturelding ahead of the 2013 season.

Upon his arrival at Afturelding, Guðmundur was also installed as manager of the club's feeder team Hvíti Riddarinn.

References

1981 births
Living people
Association football defenders
Gudmundur Mete
Allsvenskan players
Superettan players
Malmö FF players
FC Midtjylland players
IFK Norrköping players
Gudmundur Mete
Gudmundur Mete
Gudmundur Mete
Gudmundur Mete
Gudmundur Mete
Gudmundur Mete
Gudmundur Mete
Gudmundur Mete